79P/du Toit–Hartley or du Toit 2 is a periodic comet, now divided into two parts, in the Solar System with an orbital period of 5.06 years.

It was originally discovered by Daniel du Toit at the Boyden Observatory, Bloemfontein, South Africa (then administered by Harvard College) on 9 April 1945 with a brightness of apparent magnitude 10.

Uncertainties in the calculation of the orbit meant the comet was lost until rediscovered by Malcolm Hartley of the UK Schmidt Telescope Unit, Siding Spring, Australia in 1982, when it was found to have broken into two parts, probably in 1976. Both parts had a brightness of magnitude 17. Observed in 1987, it was missed in 1992 but rediscovered by astronomers at Los Molinos Observatory, Uruguay on 4 March 2003 at magnitude 17. Fragment 79P-B is lost as it only has a 23-day observation arc from 1982.

See also 
 List of numbered comets

References 
 

Periodic comets
079P
0079
Comets in 2013
Comets in 2018
19450409